The Visuotinė lietuvių enciklopedija or VLE is a 25-volume universal Lithuanian-language encyclopedia published by the Science and Encyclopaedia Publishing Institute from 2001 to 2014. VLE is the first published universal encyclopedia in independent Lithuania (it replaces the former Lietuviškoji Tarybinė Enciklopedija which was published in thirteen volumes from 1976 to 1985). The last volume, XXV, was published in July 2014. An additional volume of updates, error corrections, and indexes was published in 2015. The encyclopedia's twenty-five volumes contain nearly 122,000 articles and about 25,000 illustrations. Since June 2017, VLE is published as an online encyclopedia being updated to present day.

Description 
VLE is an encyclopedia published in Lithuanian, therefore it focuses on Lithuania, Lithuanians and Lithuanian topics (Lithuanian personalities, organizations, language, culture, national activities). These articles make up about 20–25% of all articles and illustrations (about 6,000 articles are intended to describe personalities alone).

Separate thematic articles contain articles on Lithuanian studies - about Lithuania and Lithuanians. Much space in the VLE is devoted to topics banned or ignored during the Soviet era: Lithuanian statehood, the history of the Catholic Church, the army, Lithuania's resistance to Nazi and Soviet occupation, the history of the Lithuanian state, Lithuania Minor. Juozapas Girdzijauskas stated that VLE "will objectively acquaint the society with the world's culture, capture the modern level of science, promote the humanistic values ​​of humanity, and help the Lithuanian people to overcome the Soviet ideology".

Editorial board
Coordination and editing of Visuotinė lietuvių enciklopedija is carried by prominent Lithuanian scholars:

prof., habil. dr. Algirdas Ambrazas;
prof. habil. dr. Antanas Bandzaitis;
dr. Jonas Boruta;
prof. habil. dr. Juozapas Girdzijauskas;
prof. habil. dr. Bronius Grigelionis;
prof. habil. dr. Leonas Kadžiulis;
doc. dr. Algirdas Kiselis;
prof. habil. dr. Vytautas Kubilius 
Dr. Elvyra Janina Kunevičienė;
prof. habil. dr. Alfonsas Skrinska;
prof. habil. dr. Antanas Tyla;
akad. prof. habil. dr. Zigmas Zinkevičius

Additionally, editorial-scientific boards of 23–25 scholars were established for the main science branches. In total, there were 2,957 authors.

See also
Lithuanian encyclopedias
Academic History of Lithuania
List of online encyclopedias

References

External links 

Website of Science and Encyclopaedia Publishing Institute
 Visuotinė lietuvių enciklopedija

Lithuanian encyclopedias
2001 books
21st-century encyclopedias